Sam "Sammy"/"Thommo" Thompson (born 9 October 1986) is an English former rugby league footballer who played for St. Helens in the Super League.

He made his début in the Challenge Cup victory against the London Skolars on 20 April 2008.

He joined National League One side the Widnes Vikings for the 2009 season.

References

External links
St Helens profile
Saints Heritage Society profile

1986 births
Living people
English rugby league players
London Broncos players
Rugby league props
St Helens R.F.C. players
Whitehaven R.L.F.C. players
Widnes Vikings players